Thenon is a commune in the Dordogne department in Nouvelle-Aquitaine in southwestern France.

Geography 
The market town of Thenon is situated on the main road between the towns of Brive la Gaillarde (40 km east) and Périgueux (33 km west), surrounded by farmland and forests. The northern edge of Thenon is set on a prominent ridge. Its recent history is strongly linked to the road network. The D6089 road passes through Thenon and continues west to Bordeaux on the coast. For many years, Thenon was blighted by this road, which was a main haulage and tourist route and very frequently congested. Heavy road traffic nonetheless brought stopovers and tourists, retail trade, demand for accommodation, and restaurants.  But in the mid-2000s the east-west A89/E70 toll road (la Transeuropéenne) was opened, passing north of Thenon and funnelling the major traffic flow away from the town. Thenon station is several kilometers north from the town centre and has rail connections to Bordeaux, Périgueux and Brive-la-Gaillarde. Thenon was not given an exit (sortie) close by, and thus it is now bypassed.

History 
Prehistory and history is described for the Aquitaine region, which has some of the most important prehistoric cave dwellings in Europe.

The region was a strong centre of resistance against Germany in World War II. The nearby village of Rouffignac-Saint-Cernin-de-Reilhac was almost entirely destroyed as an act of retribution, after two German soldiers were captured by French partisans.

Economy 
The high street of Thenon (Av. de la 4eme République) passes north–south and is the scene of a weekly market and some shops. To the southern end is the cultural heart, the Place Pasteur with a church, older buildings (some medieval), marketplace (shown here) and a small château dating from the 12th century (captured briefly by the English in 1439, retaken by Charles II's troops). Only part of the castle remains. Over the last 25 years the main street has hosted at least three supermarkets, a grocer, butcher, bars, hardware store, 2 boulangeries, a bank,  and 2 chemists. However, with the reduction in traffic on the D6089, the High Street has 'died' and most or its retail outlets have closed except the boulangeries and chemist. The Mairie has offered subsidised rent to businesses willing to re-occupy the vacant stores, with some success as of 2015 when the bar/cafe was again reopened as a cooperative. A medium-sized supermarket on the now-quiet D6089 west of town has become the main retail store, with the bar and bank opposite in modern premises, and local residents feel much has been lost by these closures and relocations. In addition, some commercial activity in Thenon has been lost because the 1990s/2000s boom in French second-homes, from which this region benefited through high property prices and more consumers and tax income, has now subsided. There is a primary school and middle school, the Collège Suzanne Lacore. The nearest high school is in Terrasson, 16.5 km away.

The region has a strong farming heritage, but little industrial activity or service occupations (there is a large paper mill east at Le Lardin). With poor soils, walnut trees, figs and sheep are common, with few vineyards and cereals. Tertiary sector jobs are largely found in Périgueux 35 km away, or in the slightly larger towns like Montignac on the Vézère River, 14 km to the south east (the nearest town to the Lascaux caves).  The beautiful countryside around the town is steep and rolling, with farms interspersed with woodlands, in which the local population continues to hunt enthusiastically for rabbits, wild boar and deer. Tourism still peaks in the summer months when the weekly market is a little more animated and the etang (lake) below the town hosts swimming and a cafe.

The estate agent advertises in both French and English, and there are a few English and Dutch summer homes and year-round residents, mainly located outside the town in the surrounding villages. Property prices have not increased in recent years. Overseas migrants are attracted by the cheaper property prices compared to the Vézère and Dordogne villages to the south.

Population

See also
Communes of the Dordogne department

References

Communes of Dordogne